Pertti Kullervo Paasio (2 April 1939 – 4 April 2020) was a Finnish politician from the Social Democratic Party. He was born in Helsinki.

Paasio participated in the municipal politics of Turku and was elected into the municipal council in 1965. Paasio became member of the Parliament in July 1975, however, he lost the seat in the 1979 parliamentary elections. In 1982 he replaced Jacob Söderman in the Parliament and held the seat until he was elected into the European Parliament in 1996. 

Paasio followed the path of his father, Rafael Paasio, when he was elected to succeed Kalevi Sorsa as the Chairman of Social Democratic Party in 1987. Paasio succeeded Sorsa in the government as the Minister of Foreign Affairs on 1 February 1989. However, Social Democratic Party suffered a defeat in 1991 parliamentary elections, which led to the resignation of Paasio as the party chairman. 

His daughter Heli Paasio was a member of the Parliament. He died on 4 April 2020, two days after his 81st birthday.

References 

1939 births
2020 deaths
Politicians from Helsinki
Leaders of the Social Democratic Party of Finland
Deputy Prime Ministers of Finland
Ministers for Foreign Affairs of Finland
Members of the Parliament of Finland (1975–79)
Members of the Parliament of Finland (1979–83)
Members of the Parliament of Finland (1983–87)
Members of the Parliament of Finland (1987–91)
Members of the Parliament of Finland (1991–95)
Members of the Parliament of Finland (1995–99)
MEPs for Finland 1996–1999
Children of national leaders